Cruchaga is a surname. Notable people with the surname include:

Albert Hurtado Cruchaga or Alberto Hurtado (1901–1952), Chilean Jesuit priest, lawyer, social worker and writer of Basque origin
Angel Cruchaga Santa María (1893–1964), Chilean writer
Carlos González Cruchaga (1921–2008), Chilean Bishop of the Roman Catholic Church
César Cruchaga (born 1974), retired Spanish football defender
Juan Guzmán Cruchaga (1895–1979), Chilean poet and diplomat
Carlos Cruchaga (born 1978), human genomicist researcher focusing neurodegenerative diseases